Chicagoland Speedway is a  tri-oval speedway with a curved backstretch in Ingalls Park, Illinois. It is adjacent to the Joliet city limits, southwest of Chicago. The speedway opened in 2001 and actively hosted NASCAR racing including the NASCAR Cup Series until 2019. Until 2010, the speedway has also hosted the IndyCar Series, recording numerous close finishes including the closest finish in IndyCar history. The speedway is currently owned and operated by NASCAR.

History

First discussions of building a major speedway near Chicago took place in an informal meeting between Indianapolis Motor Speedway President Tony George and International Speedway Corporation Chief Executive Officer Bill France Jr. in late 1995. Together they formed The Motorsports Alliance, a joint company owned by Indianapolis Motor Speedway Corporation and International Speedway Corporation. By 1995, a major racing facility had been built or was near completion near Las Vegas, Los Angeles and the Dallas-Fort Worth Metroplex. The Chicago area was an untapped market for motorsports that had potential to be very lucrative. In 1996, the search began for a site to build a speedway somewhere near Chicago. Several sites were considered, and a track was built in suburban Cicero (Chicago Motor Speedway), but eventually attention turned to the Joliet area where George Barr had negotiated to build Route 66 Raceway. Barr convinced Joliet officials to meet with the Motorsports Alliance to discuss building their speedway adjacent to Route 66 Raceway. The success of Route 66 Raceway, completed in 1998, led to the city conducting an impact study of the proposed speedway. The study revealed the new speedway would generate $300 million for the Joliet and Will County region and over 3,000 jobs.

The Joliet city council unanimously approved the speedway on January 19, 1999. Following the approval, the Will County Board extended the Des Plaines River Valley Enterprise Zone in order to give a tax break to the speedway developers.  The tax break news also led to the Joliet High School district threatening to bail out of the enterprise zone, but a compromise was reached. In May 1999, The Motorsports Alliance combined with Route 66 Raceway LLC to form Raceway Associates, LCC with Coyne as president alongside George and France.

Raceway Associates revealed the track would be a  d-shaped tri-oval superspeedway. Joie Chitwood III was named vice president and general manager of the facility. During the announcement, France stated the significance of the new speedway: 

Architecture and engineering firm HNTB, which has built stadiums and arenas such as the RCA Dome, Los Angeles Coliseum and the Rose Bowl, was selected to lead the design of the facility. Construction management company Bovis Lend Lease headed the construction of the speedway. Construction started in August 1999, with groundbreaking September 28, 1999. On May 8, 2000, in a press conference at Chicago's Navy Pier, the track's name and inaugural events were announced. Construction of the speedway resulted in a few problems. In the summer of 2000, homes near the speedway were flooded as a result of heavy rains and run-off from excavation. In February 2001, a worker was killed after falling from the skybox suites on top of the grandstands. Construction was completed in spring 2001.

The track has seen little expansion since its construction, with the only major addition being the installation of lights around the track in 2008. This was "phase one" of four phases that were originally designed for construction and possible expansion. Phase four would consist of a Bristol type seating capacity completely surrounding the speedway.  The Indycar Series ran at the track since 2001, recording three of the top five closest finishes in Indycar history, including the closest in 2002. Despite the close finishes, the speedway announced IndyCar would not return to the track for the 2011 season. The speedway also announced changes to the NASCAR schedule for 2011, with the NASCAR Cup Series race moving to September 16–18 as the first race in the 2011 Chase for the Championship. The Nationwide Series and Camping World Truck Series also raced the same weekend, in addition, the Nationwide Series had a stand-alone race day on June 4.

On May 14, 2015, Andersen Promotions, which organizes the Indy Lights series, conducted an oval test at Chicagoland Speedway, marking the first time since 2010 any level of the Mazda Road to Indy was at the track.  The test was used by INDYCAR officials to give the Dallara IL-15 its first official oval laps.

On January 28, 2019, it was revealed on ISC's 2018 annual report that the raceway's track seating was reduced from 55,000 to 47,000.

Due to the COVID-19 pandemic, races at the Chicagoland Speedway for the 2020 season were canceled. Shortly thereafter, most of the track employees were laid off. On May 11, 2020, it was leaked that large parts of the land around the track would be sub-developed into an industrial park, leaving the future of the speedway unknown.

On September 27, 2020 rumors arose that Chicagoland Speedway as well as Kentucky Speedway would lose their NASCAR races in 2021, which was officially confirmed by the speedway two days later on September 29. In addition, neighboring Route 66 Raceway announced it would remain closed through the 2021 season, leaving both tracks without scheduled races for the 2021 season.

On January 6, 2023, it was announced that Chicagoland Speedway would host the SuperMotorcross World Championship Playoff Round 2.  This would be the first race at the track in any capacity since 2019.

Track length of paved oval
The track length varies between the two major series that run at Chicagoland Speedway.

Track records

Lap Records
The official race lap records at Chicagoland Speedway are listed as:

NASCAR Cup Series records 
(As of 6/30/19)

* from minimum 2 starts.
++ Since 2001.
** Since 2018.

References

External links

Chicagoland Speedway Official Site
Map and circuit history at RacingCircuits.info

Chicagoland Speedway Page  on NASCAR.com
Chicagoland Speedway on RacewayReport.com – Local area information, track specs, mapping, news and more.
High Resolution image from Google Maps

IndyCar Series tracks
Sports venues in Joliet, Illinois
Motorsport venues in Illinois
NASCAR tracks
ARCA Menards Series tracks
International Race of Champions tracks
NASCAR races at Chicagoland Speedway
Sports venues completed in 2001
Off-road racing venues in the United States
2001 establishments in Illinois